The Taipei Economic and Cultural Office in Malaysia (Malay: Pejabat Ekonomi dan Kebudayaan Taipei) is the representative office of Taiwan in Malaysia, which functions as a de facto embassy in the absence of diplomatic relations. 

Its counterpart body in Taiwan is the Malaysian Friendship and Trade Centre in Taipei.

History
The office was established in 1974 as the Far East Travel and Trade Centre. Until that year, Taiwan, as the Republic of China, had a Consulate-General in Kuala Lumpur. This had previously been established as a Consulate in 1964, before being upgraded to a Consulate-General five years later.

However, this was closed after Malaysia established full diplomatic relations with the People's Republic of China. The office was upgraded in 1988, and renamed the Taipei Economic and Cultural Centre. It adopted its present name in 1992.

See also
Malaysia–Taiwan relations
List of diplomatic missions of Taiwan
Taipei Economic and Cultural Representative Office

References

1974 establishments in Malaysia
Malaysia
Malaysia–Taiwan relations
Taiwan
Organizations established in 1974